Kaitlin Marie Bennett (born October 15, 1995), also known as the Kent State Gun Girl, is an American gun rights activist and conservative social media personality. She received media attention in 2018 for open-carrying an AR-10 rifle at Kent State University after graduating.

Bennett and her husband run Liberty Hangout. Initially described as a libertarian media outlet, the website later became more politically conservative.

Early life 
Bennett was the president of the Kent State chapter of Turning Point USA; however, after a protest against campus safe spaces backfired in October 2017, she resigned. In May 2018, Bennett graduated with a degree in biology from Kent State University in Kent, Ohio.

Media attention 
In 2018, Bennett posed for her graduation photo from the university holding an AR-10 long gun in front of the university sign. She stated that as a student at Kent State, she should have been able to open-carry for self-defense, citing the 1970 Kent State shootings where Ohio National Guardsmen fired on unarmed students protesting the U.S. bombing of Cambodia. As social media users mainly associated Bennett with her gun rights activism, many media publications referenced her "Gun Girl" nickname.

Later in 2018, Bennett organized an open-carry rally at the college. The university released a statement that a cease and desist order had been issued against advertising the event, as Bennett had not attempted to register it with the university. Following her initial protest of Kent State, Bennett became a correspondent for InfoWars. Due to her affiliation with the extremist site, she was excluded from a campaign event for Bernie Sanders. She returned to the university in November of that year to host a discussion on gun rights. 

In January 2020, clips surfaced online of her 2019 interviews with University of Kentucky students. Originally posted by Liberty Hangout with the title "College Students Have No Morals", the videos show Bennett questioning the students on the issue of resources for transgender people in bathrooms. The clips quickly became popular on social media, with users entertained by the dichotomy between Bennett and the interviewees' reactions to the topic. One student seen in the interviews used the online attention to raise money for charity.

In February 2020, Bennett went to Ohio University to ask trivia questions for President's Day, but was confronted by a large crowd of college students opposing her. Chants of "where's your diaper?" and "shit your pants” were heard in reference to an unsubstantiated rumor that she defecated in her pants while attending a Kent State fraternity party while in school. Drinks and other objects, including toilet paper, were hurled at her. Later in October, Bennett was similarly ridiculed when visiting the University of Central Florida.

Criticism continued in 2020 when it was revealed that the website associated with Bennet, Liberty Hangout, made comments in 2016 denying the Holocaust on Twitter. The tweet and the anti-Semitic responses from followers had long been deleted.

Personal life 
Bennett became engaged in 2019 to Justin Moldow, the founder of Liberty Hangout. She announced her conversion to Christianity on the site, and the couple later married in a March 2020 Catholic ceremony. On April 6, 2022, she announced the birth of their first child on Twitter.

References

External links

 Liberty Hangout official site

1995 births
21st-century American women
2018 controversies in the United States
2020 controversies in the United States
Activists from Ohio
American anti-abortion activists
American gun rights activists
American women journalists
Gun politics in the United States
Internet-related controversies
Kent State University alumni
Living people
Female critics of feminism
People from Zanesville, Ohio
Right-wing populism in the United States